Fausta is a genus of flies in the family Tachinidae.

Species
F. beybienkoi Zimin, 1960
F. inusta Mesnil, 1957
F. mimetes Zimin, 1960
F. nemorum (Meigen, 1824)
F. nigritibia Chao & Zhou, 1996

References

Tachininae
Tachinidae genera
Taxa named by Jean-Baptiste Robineau-Desvoidy